See also Alcazar Theatre (1911) and Alcazar Theatre (1976) for two other SF theaters of the same name.

The Alcazar Theatre was a theatre at 116 O'Farrell Street, between Stockton and Powell, in San Francisco, California. Opened in 1885, the structure served as a lecture and music hall, but soon housed a popular resident stock company, which included Maude Adams, under the management of the younger brother of David Belasco, Fred Belasco(1862-1920).

The Alcazar Theatre was destroyed in the 1906 San Francisco earthquake. In 1911, another Alcazar Theatre opened one block to the west.

References

External links

Photo of Alcazar Theater at 116 O'Farrell Street in San Francisco (AAA-8532)

Theatres in the San Francisco Bay Area
Event venues established in 1885
1885 establishments in California
Theatres completed in 1885
Buildings and structures destroyed in the 1906 San Francisco earthquake
Demolished theatres in California